was a Japanese film actor. He appeared in more than 100 films from 1963 to 2013.

Career
In 1960, Natsuyagi began attending the Bungakuza actors school while attending Keio University. He eventually left Keio before graduating and entered the Haiyuza actors school. After graduating in 1966, he joined the Toei studio and made his film debut with Hone made shaburu. His first starring role was in Hideo Gosha's Kiba Ōkaminosuke (1966).

Filmography

Film

Television

Anime

Dubbing
The Bridges of Madison County – Robert Kincaid (Clint Eastwood)
A Fistful of Dollars (1974 TBS edition) – Joe (Clint Eastwood)
Nighthawks (1984 Fuji TV edition) – Deke DaSilva (Sylvester Stallone)

Awards and prizes

References

External links
 

1939 births
2013 deaths
People from Kamakura
Male actors from Kanagawa Prefecture
Male actors from Tokyo
Japanese male film actors